128th may refer to:

128th (Moose Jaw) Battalion, CEF, a unit in the Canadian Expeditionary Force during the First World War
128th Air Refueling Wing, an Air Mobility Command unit of the Wisconsin Air National Guard
128th Airborne Command and Control Squadron, a unit of the Georgia Air National Guard that flies the E-8C Joint STARS
128th Delaware General Assembly, a meeting of the Delaware Senate and the Delaware House of Representatives
128th Illinois Volunteer Infantry Regiment, an infantry regiment that served in the Union Army during the American Civil War
128th Infantry Brigade (United Kingdom), a 1st Line Territorial Army brigade of the British Army during the Second World War
128th Infantry Regiment (United States), a United States military unit of the Wisconsin National Guard
128th Mechanized Brigade (Ukraine), a formation of the Ukrainian Ground Forces
128th meridian east, a line of longitude 128° east of Greenwich
128th meridian west, a line of longitude 128° west of Greenwich
128th New York Volunteer Infantry, a volunteer regiment from upstate New York during the American Civil War
128th Pioneers, an infantry regiment of the British Indian Army
128th Regiment of Foot, an infantry regiment of the British Army, created in 1794 and disbanded in 1796
Ohio 128th General Assembly, the current legislative body of the state of Ohio for the years 2009 and 2010

See also
128 (number)
AD 128, the year 128 (CXXVIII) of the Julian calendar
128 BC